Diffwys is a mountain in Snowdonia, Wales, near Barmouth and forms part of the Rhinogydd. On the north side is an exposure of the Caerdion Syncline. It is technically a subsidiary summit of Y Llethr, missing Marilyn status by 2m. It is therefore a sub Marilyn.

The summit has a trig point. To the north is Y Llethr and Crib-y-rhiw, to the east is Y Garn, to the south is Cadair Idris, and to the west is its top Diffwys West Top.

References

External links 
www.geograph.co.uk : photos of Diffwys and surrounding area

Dyffryn Ardudwy
Llanelltyd
Mountains and hills of Gwynedd
Mountains and hills of Snowdonia
Hewitts of Wales
Nuttalls